Small treefrog may refer to:

 Black eye-lidded small treefrog, a frog found in China, Vietnam, and Thailand
 Hainan small treefrog, a frog found in Cambodia, China, Laos, Thailand, and possibly India and Myanmar
 Jinxiu small treefrog, a frog found in China and Vietnam
 Longchuan small treefrog, a frog found in China, Vietnam, and possibly Myanmar
 Medog small treefrog, a frog found in China
 Mengla small treefrog, a frog endemic to Yunnan, China
 Ocellated small treefrog, a frog endemic to Hainan Island, China
 Serrate-legged small treefrog, a frog found in China, Vietnam, Laos, and possibly Myanmar

Animal common name disambiguation pages